The Cauchy–Born rule or Cauchy–Born approximation is a basic hypothesis used in the mathematical formulation of solid mechanics which relates the movement of atoms in a crystal to the overall deformation of the bulk solid. It states that in a crystalline solid subject to a small strain, the positions of the atoms within the crystal lattice follow the overall strain of the medium. The currently accepted form is Max Born's refinement of Cauchy's original hypothesis which was used to derive the equations satisfied by the Cauchy stress tensor. The approximation generally holds for face-centered and body-centered cubic crystal systems. For complex lattices such as diamond, however, the rule has to be modified to allow for internal degrees of freedom between the sublattices. The approximation can then be used to obtain bulk properties of crystalline materials such as stress-strain relationship.

For crystalline bodies of finite size, the effect of surface stress is also significant. However, the standard Cauchy–Born rule cannot deduce the surface properties. To overcome this limitation, Park et al. (2006) proposed a surface Cauchy–Born rule. Several modified forms of the Cauchy–Born rule have also been proposed to cater to crystalline bodies having special shapes. Arroyo & Belytschko (2002) proposed an exponential Cauchy Born rule for modeling of mono-layered crystalline sheets as two-dimensional continuum shells. Kumar et al. (2015) proposed a helical Cauchy–Born rule for modeling slender bodies (such as nano and continuum rods) as special Cosserat continuum rods.

References
 .
 .
 .
 .

Crystallography
Max Born